Balaya  is a town and sub-prefecture in the Lélouma Prefecture in the Labé Region of northern-central Guinea.

 Balaya  is one of 86 villages (barangay) in the City of San Carlos province of Pangasina in the Philippines.

Sub-prefectures of the Labé Region